Karm is a 1977 Hindi movie produced and directed by B. R. Chopra. The film stars Rajesh Khanna, Vidya Sinha, Shabana Azmi, Urmila Matondkar  and Master Bittoo. The songs wrtin by Rajkavi Inderjeet Singh Tulsi and music given  by R. D. Burman. The film was Golden Jubilee hit at the box office. This film was the first film of Matondkar as a child artist

Plot
Retired Judge Shyamlal Kumar lives in a palatial home with his wife and only son, Arvind, who is now studying law and is on his way to becoming a lawyer. Arvind meets beautiful Asha Shastri, and they fall in love. Asha introduces Arvind to her astrologer father, Chintamani, who instantly approves of Arvind, as Arvind's parents do of Asha. But when Chintamani sees a dark future for the young couple, he withdraws his blessings and asks them not to marry. Spooked by this, Shyamlal and his wife also ask Arvind to marry someone else, but Arvind and Asha start living together. This causes anger in their conservative community, and both are blacklisted. Asha becomes pregnant, but does not know that Arvind has met a young woman named Neelam Shukla, who believes that Arvind is a bachelor and wants to marry him at all and any cost.

Saddened by her father's death and his last warning that Asha should not touch his dead body, pregnant Asha leaves Arvind to go into oblivion at Haridwar. She meets Swamiji there and resides at his ashram. There she gives birth to a son and works as a nurse in Dehradun. Meanwhile, Arvind gives in to his parents' wish to marry Neelam & moves to London for future studies with her. Both return after 5 yrs and In the turn of events, Judge Arvind shifts to Dehradun and unknowingly gets in touch with his own son. Neelam's pregnancy gets complicated and the doctors could not save their child. Neelam can no longer become a mother again. Arvind meets Asha (now Sadhna) in the same hospital. He enquires about his son and finally would like to adopt him. When Asha gives in to her husband's wish, the boy comes to Arvind and Neelam's home with a letter. Neelam gets the letter and becomes furious after reading it. She returns the boy to Asha and drives madly back to their home. Arvind tries to explain things to her while she is recklessly driving, but it's of no help. Neelam rams the car into a running train; seriously injuring both Arvind and herself. She dies after listening to Arvind and Asha's story. Arvind is brought to hospital on the verge of death. He fills sindoor in front of God in hospital & marries Asha thinking that he is about to die anyway. 
The doctor takes him to the operation theatre. Asha along with her son and Swamiji prays to Lord Shiva. Operation overs but Arvind is in critical condition at ICU.
Will Asha's father's prediction come true? Will Arvind live after getting married with Asha?

Yes, Ashas prayers are answered and Arvind stays alive and regains consciousness miraculously.
All stays happily everafter.

Cast

Rajesh Khanna as Arvind
Vidya Sinha as Asha Shastri/Sadhna
Shabana Azmi as Neelam
Asrani
Manmohan Krishna
Om Shivpuri as Sawami
Master Bittoo 
Urmila Matondkar

Soundtrack
songs wrtin by Rajkavi Inderjeet Singh Tulsi

References

External links
 

Films scored by R. D. Burman
1977 films
Indian family films
Indian drama films
1970s Hindi-language films
Films directed by B. R. Chopra
1977 drama films
Hindi-language drama films